The 2009–10 Notre Dame Fighting Irish women's basketball team will represent the University of Notre Dame in the 2009–10 NCAA Division I women's basketball season.

Offseason
May 4: The Irish will participate in the 2009 US Virgin Islands Paradise Jam at University of Virgin Islands. The event is celebrating its tenth anniversary. Games will be played at the U.V.I. Sports and Fitness Center, the Caribbean's premier basketball facility located in Charlotte Amalie, St. Thomas.
May 14: Senior guard Lindsay Schrader (Bartlett, Ill./Bartlett) scored a team-high 15 points to lead four Notre Dame players in double figures. The Irish picked up its second victory in as many games on its European tour with a wire-to-wire 78-68 win over GEAS Sesto San Giovanni at the Sesto San Giovanni Municipal Gymnasium outside of Milan, Italy. Schrader also collected eight rebounds and four steals, while shooting 7-of-12 from the floor. Sophomore guard Natalie Novosel had 13 points, five rebounds and five steals, while senior guard Ashley Barlow and junior forward Becca Bruszewski added 12 points apiece for Notre Dame.
May 18, 2009: Fighting Irish incoming freshman Skylar Diggins has been selected as one of 14 finalists for the 2009 USA Basketball U19 World Championship Team. The choices were made from a field of 27 players ages 19-and-under (born on or after Jan. 1, 1990) that competed in three days of trials in Colorado Springs, Colo., at the U.S. Olympic Training Center.
August 18: On January. 16, Notre Dame and Connecticut will be part of the first-ever ESPN women's basketball College GameDay broadcast. The game will be broadcast from Gampel Pavilion in Storrs, Conn. The matchup between the Fighting Irish and Huskies will tip off at 9 p.m. (ET) and will be televised live to a national cable audience by ESPN.

Preseason
Paradise Jam

Regular season

Roster

Schedule

Player stats

Postseason

NCAA basketball tournament

Awards and honors

Team players drafted into the WNBA

References

External links
Official Site

Notre Dame Fighting Irish women's basketball seasons
Notre Dame
Notre Dame
Notre Dame Fighting Irish
Notre Dame Fighting Irish